Matúš Malý (born 11 July 2001) is a Slovak footballer who plays for Ružomberok as a defender.

Club career

DAC Dunajská Streda
As an alumnus of DAC Dunajská Streda's academy, Malý made his Fortuna Liga debut for DAC in MOL Aréna, in a derby match against Slovan Bratislava on 1 July 2020. He came on to the pitch in the first half as a replacent for Martin Bednár, who suffered an injury. Dunajská Streda lost the game against the season's champions 1:3. After an impressive performance, he completed the full length of two final games of the season against Žilina and Ružomberok, during which DAC did not concede a single goal.

MFK Ružomberok
In mid-June 2022, Malý signed a three-year contract with Ružomberok.

References

External links
 FC DAC 1904 Dunajská Streda official club profile 
 Futbalnet profile 
 
 

2001 births
Living people
Sportspeople from Dunajská Streda
Slovak footballers
Slovakia youth international footballers
Slovakia under-21 international footballers
Association football defenders
FC DAC 1904 Dunajská Streda players
FC ŠTK 1914 Šamorín players
FK Senica players
MFK Ružomberok players
Slovak Super Liga players
2. Liga (Slovakia) players